The Jinbei S70 or Jinbei Tjatse (蒂阿兹) is a mid-size three-row crossover produced by Jinbei.

Overview

The Jinbei S70, or Jinbei Tjatse pronounced as Jinbei Diazi, was unveiled on the 2016 Chengdu Auto Show in China. 
 
Engine options of the Jinbei S70 includes a 1.5L turbo inline 4 producing 154hp at 5200 rpm, and a 1.5L turbo inline 4 producing 154hp at 5500 rpm.

Prices of the Jinbei S70 ranges from 79,800 to 113,00 yuan as of 2019.

It was reported in 2018 that a pickup variant of the Jinbei S70 was in development, sharing everything ahead the C pillars.

Design controversies
The design of the Jinbei S70 is very controversial as the styling was clearly reverse engineered from the third generation Acura MDX.

References

External links
Jinbei Official website

Crossover sport utility vehicles
Mid-size sport utility vehicles
Front-wheel-drive vehicles
S70
2010s cars
Cars introduced in 2016